Fahda is an Arabic feminine given name. Notable people with the name include:

 Fahda bint Falah Al Hithlain, Saudi royal and third wife of King Salman
 Fahda bint Saud Al Saud (born 1953), Saudi royal and daughter of King Saud 
 Fahda bint Asi Al Shuraim (died 1934), Arabian royal woman, mother of former Saudi King Abdullah

See also
 Fahd (disambiguation)

Arabic feminine given names